Claude Imbert (born 1933) is a French philosopher, logician, and translator of Gottlob Frege.

Education and career
Imbert earned an agrégation in 1955 at the École normale supérieure, and is a professor emeritus of the École normale supérieure.

Recognition
Imbert won the Prix de l'essai of the Académie Française in 1995 for her work "Par Bonheur".

Books
Imbert's works include:
Les fondements de l'arithmétique (translation of Gottlob Frege's The Foundations of Arithmetic (Coll. "L'ordre philosophique", Paris: Ed. du Seuil, 1969)
Ecrits logiques et philosophiques (translation of Gottlob Frege's essays on logic and philosophy  (Coll. "L'ordre philosophique", Paris: Ed. du Seuil, 1971)
Phénoménologies et langues formulaires (Coll. "Epiméthée", Paris: PUF, 1992)
Pour une histoire de la logique: Un héritage platonicien (Paris: PUF, 1999)

References

Further reading

1933 births
Living people
French logicians
Philosophers of logic
French women philosophers
Translators of philosophy
German–French translators